Elmalı is a village in the Çameli District of Denizli Province in Turkey.

References

Villages in Çameli District